Ernest Fraser Jacob  (12 September 1894 – 7 October 1971) was a British medievalist and scholar who was President of the Chetham Society, Lancashire Parish Register Society and Ecclesiastical History Society.

Education
He was educated at Twyford School, Winchester College, and then for a period at New College, Oxford - broken by service in World War I. He won a fellowship to All Souls College, Oxford, and taught there and at Christ Church where his pupils included A. L. Rowse.

Professor
He was then Professor of History at Manchester University from 1929 to 1944 before returning to Oxford as Chichele Professor of Modern History at All Souls from 1950 until 1961. He was an able academic politician, and is said to have recruited Sir Lewis Namier to Manchester by reading in his newspaper that Namier had no position, making a phone-call to invite him to take a chair, and only then walking over to tell the Vice-Chancellor of the recruitment. Jacob was a Member of the Chetham Society, serving as a Member of Council from 1931 and as President from 1938 until 1971.

He was a Fellow of the Society of Antiquaries, Royal Historical Society and British Academy and also President of the Ecclesiastical History Society (1965–66).

Legacy
Jacob is remembered as the link between the old school of 'structuralist' medievalists, including distinguished names such as William Stubbs, T. F. Tout and F. W. Maitland, and the subsequent school of more socio-political medieval historiography, to which J. S. Roskell, K.B. McFarlane and C. A. J. Armstrong belonged. His professorships at Manchester and Oxford did much to make the two schools England's academic centres for medieval studies.

References

External links 
 Chetham Society

1894 births
1971 deaths
People educated at Winchester College
Academics of the Victoria University of Manchester
Alumni of New College, Oxford
Fellows of All Souls College, Oxford
British medievalists
People educated at Twyford School
Chichele Professors of Modern History
20th-century British historians
Presidents of the Ecclesiastical History Society
Chetham Society
Lancashire Parish Register Society